Silver Streak is a 1976 American buddy comedy thriller film about a murder on a Los Angeles-to-Chicago train journey. It was directed by Arthur Hiller and stars Gene Wilder, Jill Clayburgh, and Richard Pryor, with Patrick McGoohan, Ned Beatty, Clifton James, Ray Walston, Scatman Crothers, and Richard Kiel in supporting roles. The film score is by Henry Mancini. This film marked the first pairing of Wilder and Pryor, who were later paired in three more films.

Plot
Book editor George Caldwell, en route to a wedding aboard the Silver Streak, meets salesman Bob Sweet and Hilly Burns, secretary to Rembrandt historian Professor Schreiner. While sharing nightcaps in Hilly's sleeper car, George sees Schreiner's body fall from the train outside her window. Investigating Schreiner's train compartment, George encounters Johnson, Whiney, and Reace: three suspicious individuals who have ransacked Schreiner's belongings. Reace throws George off the train. After walking along the tracks, George meets a farmer and they overtake the train in her biplane.

George sees Hilly with art dealer Roger Devereau and his employees Johnson (impersonating Schreiner), and Whiney. Devereau apologizes to George for the misunderstanding involving Reace, also under his employ. Sweet reveals himself to be an undercover FBI agent named Stevens. The bureau has been investigating Devereau, a criminal who passes himself off as an art expert. Devereau's plan is to discredit Schreiner's book, which would expose Devereau for authenticating forgeries as original Rembrandts. Inside Schreiner's book, George finds letters written by Rembrandt that would prove Devereau's guilt. Reace kills Stevens, thinking he is George. A fight ends on the roof of the train, where George shoots Reace with a harpoon gun before being knocked off by a train signal.

On foot again, George finds the local sheriff, who has trouble making sense of his story. The sheriff says the police are after George for killing Stevens. George escapes, stealing a patrol car that had been transporting car thief Grover T. Muldoon. George and Grover work together to catch up to the train at Kansas City so George can save Hilly from Devereau's crew. Using shoe polish, Grover disguises George as a black man so George can get by police to board the train.

George is captured, but Grover poses as a steward and rescues him and Hilly from Devereau's room. After a shootout, George and Grover jump off the train and are arrested. They meet federal agent Donaldson, former partner to Stevens, who tells George and Grover the police knew George didn't kill Stevens, and Donaldson made a cover story to protect George from Devereau. After George explains Devereau's plan, Donaldson has the train stopped. Devereau burns the Rembrandt letters.

George boards with Grover as Devereau climbs onto the locomotive and shoots the fireman. Donaldson wounds Whiney but is kicked off the train by Devereau. George shoots Johnson and Devereau shoots the engineer, placing a toolbox on the switch to keep the engine running. Devereau is disabled by shots from George and Donaldson, and is decapitated by an oncoming freight train.

With the help of a porter, George uncouples the runaway engine from the passenger cars. The engine roars into Chicago's Central Station, destroying everything in its path until it crashes. The passenger cars follow, gliding safely into the station. Grover steals a Fiat X1/9 and drives away. George and Hilly bid him goodbye and leave to begin their new romantic relationship.

Cast
 Gene Wilder as George Caldwell
 Jill Clayburgh as Hildegarde "Hilly" Burns
 Richard Pryor as Grover T. Muldoon
 Patrick McGoohan as Roger Devereau
 Ned Beatty as FBI Agent Bob Stevens / Bob Sweet
 Clifton James as Sheriff Oliver Chauncey
 Gordon Hurst as Deputy "Moose"
 Ray Walston as Edgar Whiney
 Scatman Crothers as Porter Ralston
 Len Birman as FBI Agent Donaldson
 Lucille Benson as Rita Babtree
 Stefan Gierasch as Professor Arthur Schreiner / Johnson
 Valerie Curtin as Plain Jane
 Richard Kiel as Reace
 Fred Willard as Jerry Jarvis
 Ed McNamara as Benny
 Henry Beckman as Conventioneer
 Harvey Atkin as Conventioneer
 Robert Culp as FBI Agent (uncredited)
 J.A. Preston as The Waiter (uncredited)

Production

The film was based on an original screenplay by Colin Higgins, who at the time was best known for writing Harold and Maude. He wrote Silver Streak "because I had always wanted to get on a train and meet some blonde. It never happened, so I wrote a script."

Higgins wrote Silver Streak for the producers of The Devil's Daughter, a TV film he had written. Both they and Higgins wanted to get into television. The script was sent out to auction. It was set on an Amtrak train and Paramount was interested, but wanted Amtrak to give its approval. Alan Ladd Jr. and Frank Yablans at 20th Century Fox didn't want to wait and bought the script for a then-record $400,000. Ladd said "It was like the old Laurel and Hardy comedies. The hero is Laurel, he falls off the train, stumbles about, makes a fool of himself, but still gets the pretty girl. Audiences have identified with that since Buster Keaton."

Colin Higgins wanted George Segal for the hero – the character's name is George – but Fox preferred Gene Wilder. Ladd reasoned that Wilder was "younger, more identifiable for the younger audience. And he's so average, so ordinary, and he gets caught up in all these crazy adventures." (Wilder was actually older than Segal.)

Colin Higgins claimed the producers did not want Richard Pryor cast because Pryor had recently walked off The Bingo Long Traveling All-Stars & Motor Kings; he says the producer at one stage considered casting another black actor as a backup. However, Pryor was very professional during the shoot.

Release
The film had over 400 previews around the United States starting November 28, 1976 in New York City. It had its premiere at Tower East Theater in New York on Tuesday, December 7, 1976 and opened in New York City the following day. It opened in Los Angeles on Friday, December 10 before opening nationwide in an additional 350 theaters on December 22.

Reception 
The film grossed over $51 million at the box office and was praised by critics, including Roger Ebert. It maintains an 81% approval rating at Rotten Tomatoes from 21 reviews. Ruth Batchelor of the Los Angeles Free Press described it as a "fabulous, funny, suspenseful, wonderful, marvelous, sexy, fantastic trip on a train, with the most lovable group of characters ever assembled." Gene Siskel of the Chicago Tribune, however, called the film "a needlessly convoluted mystery yarn, which calls everyone's identity into question except Wilder's." Siskel, who gave the film just two stars, added that "the story isn't easy to follow" and that "I'm still not sure whether Clayburgh's character, secretary to Devereaux, was in on the hustle from the beginning." (Hilly Burns was actually Professor Schreiner's secretary, not Devereaux's.)

Awards and honors
Academy Award nomination: Best Sound (Donald O. Mitchell, Douglas O. Williams, Richard Tyler, and Harold M. Etherington)
 Nomination: Golden Globe Award for Best Actor – Motion Picture Musical or Comedy — Gene Wilder
 Writers Guild of America nomination: Best Comedy Written Directly for the Screen – Colin Higgins
 The film was chosen for the Royal Film Performance in 1977.
 In 2000, American Film Institute included the film in AFI's 100 Years...100 Laughs – #95.

Score and soundtrack
Though the film dates to 1976, Henry Mancini's score was never officially released on a soundtrack album. Intrada Records' 2002 compilation became one of the year's best-selling special releases.

References

External links

 
 
 
 
 
 Silver Streak on Soundtrack.net
 Making of Silver Streak (1976) – Pre-release promotional "Making Of"  documentary about the film.
Complete copy of script

1976 films
1970s English-language films
1970s action comedy films
1970s buddy comedy films
1970s comedy mystery films
1970s comedy thriller films
20th Century Fox films
American action comedy films
American buddy comedy films
American comedy mystery films
American comedy thriller films
Fictional trains
Films shot in Calgary
Films shot in Toronto
Films directed by Arthur Hiller
Films set on trains
Films scored by Henry Mancini
Films with screenplays by Colin Higgins
1976 comedy films
1970s American films